OPJ may stand for:

 Officier de Police Judiciaire, an officer of the police in France
 Opera Jet (ICAO), a former private jet operator based in Bratislava, Slovakia
 .OPJ, the filename extension for the file format used by the graphing software Origin
 Otto Porter Jr., American professional basketball player